is a Japanese football player. He plays for Ococias Kyoto AC.

Career
Kodai Enomoto joined J1 League club Vegalta Sendai in 2016. On March 23, he debuted in J.League Cup (v Albirex Niigata).

References

External links

1994 births
Living people
Sendai University alumni
Association football people from Gunma Prefecture
Japanese footballers
J2 League players
Vegalta Sendai players
Zweigen Kanazawa players
Iwaki FC players
Vonds Ichihara players
Ococias Kyoto AC players
Association football defenders